Ama Serwah Genfi, known professionally as Amaarae, is a Ghanaian singer known for her work around representation of gender and race in music. After collaborating with local artists and putting out a few non-album singles, she released her debut EP, Passionfruit Summers, in 2017.

In 2020, Amaarae released the song "Sad Girlz Luv Money" featuring Moliy on her debut album The Angel You Don't Know. In 2021 the song was remixed with a feature from Kali Uchis, and became a popular song on social media, streaming platforms, and charted globally.

Early life 
Amaarae was born in Accra, Ghana to Ama Bawuah and Kwadwo Boateng Genfi and was raised between Atlanta, United States and Accra, Ghana. She is the eldest of two children. Amaarae wrote her first song at the age of 13. During her teenage years, she enjoyed watching music videos and said that one of her most vivid memories was watching the music video for the Kelis song "Young, Fresh n' New". She recalls Kelis' unique expression being an inspiration for her.

During high school, she started making mixtapes. By the age of 17, she took up an internship at a music studio. At a tertiary institution, she undertook voice training and honed her songwriting skills while studying English literature. She returned to Ghana in June 2017.

Career 
Amaarae released her debut project Passionfruit Summers in 2017. The album features the song "Fluid", which was complemented by a music video.

Amaarae was named one of Apple Music Africa's Favourite New Artists in April 2018 and later that year became an Apple Music Beats 1 featured artist for her debut project Passionfruit Summers which she released through her independent record label, Golden Child LLC on November 30, 2017. In November 2018 she performed with Teni, Boj of DRB LasGidi and Odunsi at ART X Lagos, an art fair in Lagos, Nigeria.

Amaarae has also been acknowledged for her style and fashion sense. In 2018, she was featured in Vogue Magazine online in an article on four women across the globe with buzz haircuts and was mentioned as one of Vogue online's Top 100 Style Influencers of 2018. She was nominated as Artist of the Year at the Glitz Style Awards in Ghana. She has also patronized Ghanaian fashion brand Free The Youth.

On March 23, 2019, Amaarae was chosen to perform at the first Boiler Room event in Accra alongside La Meme Gang (A Collective comprising Nxwrth, RJZ, KwakuBS, Darkovibes, Kiddblack and $pacely) and rapper Kwesi Arthur.

Amaarae has since collaborated with Stonebwoy, Kojey Radical, M3NSA, Santi, Blaqbonez, Buju, Odunsi, B4bonah. In 2019, she collaborated with the Nigerian singer-songwriter Wande Coal.

On November 12, 2020, Amaarae released her debut studio album, The Angel You Don't Know. Owen Myers of Pitchfork wrote that it "crackles with innovation, a pacesetter at a time when industry bigwigs are waking up to the long-held truth that Africa is setting the global tempo for pop music."

In May 2022, Amaarae, together with Black Sherif, Stonebwoy and Smallgod met Kendrick Lamar when he visited Ghana and held a private album listening party in Accra for his new album, Mr. Morales & The Big Steppers.

Discography

Studio albums

EP

Singles

As a featured artist

Nominations

References

External links 
 Official website

Living people
Neo soul singers
21st-century Ghanaian women singers
Ghanaian record producers
Ghanaian alté singers
Year of birth missing (living people)